Hendrietta Bogopane-Zulu is the South African deputy minister in Department of Social Development (South Africa). She has been a member of parliament since 1999 and now. She is serving a fourth term in the Jacob Zuma cabinet. She was Deputy Minister of Public Works and Women, Children and Persons with Disability. Along with Michael Masutha she is one of only two leaders with disability in the current regime. She is a motivational speaker, HIV & AIDS activist, business woman and co-founded Disabled Youth South Africa. She was instrumental in drafting  the country’s UN Convention on the Rights of Persons with Disabilities’
Country Report.

Education  

 BA Business Administration - University of Central Nicaragua
She has a BTech degree
Organisation Development

Awards
For her leadership in the disability sector, she won the prestigious Henry Viscardi Achievement Awards in 2017. In 2009 she won the Top Women Awards – Excellence in Business and Public Service for her leadership in the South African Department of Public Works.

Personal life
On 13 July 2020, Bogopane-Zulu announced that she had tested positive for COVID-19.

See also

African Commission on Human and Peoples' Rights
Constitution of South Africa
History of the African National Congress
Politics in South Africa
Provincial governments of South Africa
Department of Social Development (South Africa)

References

South African politicians
South African activists
South African women activists
Living people
Year of birth missing (living people)